The year 2020 in architecture involved some significant architectural events and new buildings.

Events
November 16 – Work to dismantle the flanking walls of a pavilion erected by Tadao Ando at Piccadilly Gardens in Manchester city centre in England (2002) begins.

Buildings and structures

Australia
 Australia 108, the tallest building in Melbourne, completed.
 Crown Sydney, the tallest building in Sydney, completed.
Belgium
 Alex guesthouse (private garden building), Berlare, designed by Atelier Vens Vanbelle, completed.
Canada
Vancouver House, designed by Bjarke Ingels.
Germany
 Berlin Brandenburg Airport completed and opened on 31 October.
Hong Kong
M+ museum scheduled for completion.
 India
  World One in Mumbai, the tallest building in India, is completed.
Italy
Genoa-Saint George Bridge by Renzo Piano, over the Polcevera River in Genoa, replacing the Ponte Morandi which collapsed in 2018, completed and open to traffic on 3 August.
Japan
The Kadokawa Culture Museum at Tokorozawa Sakura Town in Tokorozawa, Japan partially opened on 1 August and then fully opened on 6 November.
Lebanon
Stone Garden (apartments), Beirut, designed by Lina Gotmeh, completed.
Mexico
Torres Obispado in Monterrey, the tallest skyscraper in Latin America, completed.
'OUM Wellness', built by the consortium Edificios Cero Energía in San Pedro Garza García, Nuevo León, the first net-zero energy building (NZEB) in Latin America.
Norway
Powerhouse Telemark, "energy positive" project in Porsgrunn designed by Snøhetta.
People's Republic of China
Nanjing Zendai Himalayas Center, designed by Ma Yansong.
1000 Trees, designed by Thomas Heatherwick in Shanghai.
"Crystal" skyway at Raffles City Chongqing, designed by Moshe Safdie, opened to public June.
 Sweden
Norra Tornen, a pair of residential buildings in Stockholm designed by OMA, is completed
Taiwan
Tainan Spring (adaptive reuse), Tainan, designed by MVRDV, completed.
United Arab Emirates
The Opus, Dubai, including a boutique hotel with interiors designed by Zaha Hadid.
Singapore Pavilion at Expo 2020 in Dubai.
United Kingdom
 100 Liverpool Street office redevelopment in the City of London, designed by Hopkins Architects.
 Hackney New Primary School and 333 Kingsland Road (apartments), East London, designed by Henley Halebrown, completed.
 Newfoundland Quay diagrid skyscraper rental apartments in London Docklands, designed by Horden Cherry Lee, projected for completion.
 Town House, combining a library and dance studios, Kingston University London, designed by Grafton Architects (Shelley McNamara and Yvonne Farrell), opened to students 6 January.
 Wolfson Building, John Radcliffe Hospital, Oxford, designed by Francis-Jones Morehen Thorp (fjmt), opened 5 March.
 Falkirk Campus, Forth Valley College, Scotland, designed by Reiach & Hall, officially opened January.

Awards
 AIA Gold Medal – Marlon Blackwell (U.S.)
 Architecture Firm Award AIA – Architecture Research Office
 Driehaus Architecture Prize for New Classical Architecture – Ong-ard Satrabhandhu

 Grand Prix de l'urbanisme –
  Grand Prix national de l'architecture –
 LEAF Award, Overall Winner – Postponed until October 2021
 Praemium Imperiale Architecture Laureate –
 Pritzker Architecture Prize – Yvonne Farrell and Shelley McNamara
 RAIA Gold Medal – John Wardle
 RIAS Award for Architecture – cancelled due to the COVID-19 pandemic
 RIBA Royal Gold Medal – Grafton Architects (Shelley McNamara and Yvonne Farrell)
 Stirling Prize – RIBA announced that the Stirling Prize awards had been postponed until 2021 due to the COVID-19 pandemic.
 Thomas Jefferson Medal in Architecture – WEISS/MANFREDI
 Twenty-five Year Award AIA – Eric Owen Moss Architects for Conjunctive Points – The New City

Exhibitions
 20 February until 14 August – Rem Koolhaas and AMO: "Countryside; the Future" at the Solomon R. Guggenheim Museum in New York City.

Deaths
February 21 – Yona Friedman, 96, Hungarian-born French architect and architectural theorist ("mobile architecture") (born 1923) 
March 15 – Vittorio Gregotti, 92, Italian architect (born 1927)
March 26 – Michael Sorkin, 71, American architect (born 1948)
March 28 – Michael McKinnell, 84, American architect (born 1935)
April 4 – Bashirul Haq, 77, Bangladeshi architect (born 1942)
April 10 – Rifat Chadirji, 93, Iraqi architect (born 1926)
April 12 – Justus Dahinden, 94, Swiss architect, teacher and writer (born 1925)
August 4 – Jean-Marc Bonfils, 57, Lebanese architect (born 1963)
September 2 – Christian Liaigre, 77, French architect and interior designer (born 1943)
December 27 – Vikram Lall - Indian architect (Akshardham temple), (Birthdate not disclosed)
December 29 – Luigi Snozzi, 88, Swiss architect (born 1963)

See also
Timeline of architecture

References

 
21st-century architecture